Raes is a Dutch patronymic surname most common in East Flanders. The archaic given name Raes or Raas was short for Erasmus or was a derivative the Middle Dutch male name Razo. People with this surname include:

Albert Raes (born 1932), Belgian magistrate and head of the Belgian Security Services
Anouk Raes (born 1988), Belgian field hockey player
Bruno Raes, Belgian darts player
Godfried-Willem Raes (born 1952), Belgian composer, performer and instrument maker
Hugo Raes (1929–2013), Belgian novelist
Maurice Raes (1907–1992), Belgian racing cyclist.
Roeland Raes (born 1934), Belgian jurist and politician
Tom Raes (born 1988), Belgian footballer

See also
Jan Raas (born 1952), Dutch cyclist
Ras (surname), surname of the same origin
Rae (disambiguation)
RAeS, the British Royal Aeronautical Society
9797 Raes, asteroid named after Hugo Raes
The Raes, Welsh-Canadian singing duo who had a television show of the same name
Raes Junction, small settlement in New Zealand

References

Dutch-language surnames
Surnames of Belgian origin
Patronymic surnames